Leif Iversen (13 December 1911 – 18 May 1989) was a Norwegian politician for the Conservative Party.

Hailing from Raudeberg, Leif Iversen was a tax clerk before becoming mayor of Nord-Vågsøy in 1937. The previous mayor for fifteen years was his father Karl Iversen. Except for the years 1940–1945 during the German occupation of Norway, Leif Iversen held the mayor post until 1965, when Nord-Vågsøy was merged with Sør-Vågsøy to create the new municipality Vågsøy.

He was also a member of Sogn og Fjordane county council, from 1938 to 1979, again except for the occupation years. He is thereby the longest-serving county politician in Sogn og Fjordane. He served as county mayor (fylkesordførar) from 1968 to 1975.

Among his various board memberships, he chaired the board which was responsible for the building of the Måløy Bridge.

References
NRK County Encyclopedia of Sogn og Fjordane 

1911 births
1989 deaths
Conservative Party (Norway) politicians
Mayors of places in Sogn og Fjordane
Chairmen of County Councils of Norway
People from Vågsøy